Bukit Saban is a state constituency in Sarawak, Malaysia, that has been represented in the Sarawak State Legislative Assembly since 2006.

The state constituency was created in the 2005 redistribution and is mandated to return a single member to the Sarawak State Legislative Assembly under the first past the post voting system.

History
2006–2016: The constituency contains the polling districts of Rimbas, Spaoh, Suri, Bukit Saban, Kubal, Brutan, Bayor, Ulu Teru, Metong, Delit, Babu, Traie, Rapong, Tot, Spaoh Hulu, Spaoh Hilir, Belabak, Lingit, Penom, Meroh, Sepuna, Samu, Mutok, Penebak, Bair, Jambu, Tiput, Pelikoi, Jaloh, Serudit, Matop, Teberu, Rembai, Bangkit.

2016–present: The constituency contains the polling districts of Penunus, Rimbas, Spaoh, Suri, Bukit Saban, Kubal, Brutan, Bayor, Ulu Teru, Metong, Delit, Babu, Traie, Rapong, Tot, Spaoh Hulu, Spaoh Hilir, Belabak, Lingit, Penom, Meroh, Sepuna, Samu, Mutok, Penebak, Bair, Jambu, Tiput, Pelikoi, Jaloh, Serudit, Matop, Teberu, Rembai, Bangkit.

Representation history

Election results

References

Sarawak state constituencies